Bruce Quarrie (1947 in London – 4 September 2004) was an English writer and author on wargaming and militaria topics.

Career
Quarrie studied English at Peterhouse, Cambridge University and graduated in 1968. He became a journalist with the Financial Times and then in 1972 joined Patrick Stephens Limited, a Cambridge specialist publisher, as editor of Airfix Magazine, which PSL produced. He wrote the first of his many books about wargaming in 1974 and in 1986 he became a full-time writer. He wrote over 40 titles, mainly on the Second World War militaria.

Quarrie was an active wargamer. His 1974 book Napoleonic Wargaming brought the hobby to wide attention. Quarrie owned a large miniature army of wargames figures, including the entire Westphalian army of the Napoleonic era.

Criticism about his choice of subject
In his 1997 book 'Revolutionary Armies in the Modern Era: A Revisionist Approach' (described as "too flawed to be recommended as an undergraduate text"), historian S.P. MacKenzie describing Quarrie's works on the Waffen-SS mentions him as a popular author who suggested that the elite Waffen SS units demonstrated toughness, innovation and courage, which along with focused aggression, changed the course of the war. Mackenzie writes that "as older generation of Waffen-SS scribes has died off, a new, post-war cadre of writers has done much to perpetuate the image of the force as a revolutionary European army" and includes Quarrie in this group.

Personal life
Quarrie was married, with two daughters and 9 grandchildren, and lived in Wellingborough, Northamptonshire.

Selected works
 Panzers in the desert, 1980
 Napoleon's Campaigns in Miniature: War Gamers' Guide to the Napoleonic Wars, 1796-1815, 4 Editions
 Tank Battles in Miniature 2: A Wargamer's Guide to the Russian Campaign 1941-45,
 Tank Battles in Miniature 3: Wargamers' Guide to the North-West European campaign 1944-1945, 1976
 Napoleonic Wargaming (Airfix Magazine Guide No. 4), 1974,  World War 2 Wargaming (Airfix Magazine Guide No. 15), 1976
 Panzergrenadier Division 'Grossdeutschland, 1977
 Fallschirmpanzer Division 'Hermann Göring''', 1978
 Tank Battles in Miniature 5: Wargamers' Guide to the Arab-Israeli Wars since 1948, 1978
 Second SS Panzer Division 'Das Reich, 1979
 World War II Photo Album 9 Panzers in Russia 1941-43, 1979
 PSL Guide to Wargaming [ed.], Patrick Stephens Ltd, 1980, 
 Fantasy Wargaming [contributor], Patrick Stephens Ltd, 1981, 
 Panzers in the Balkans and Italy, 1981
 Hitler's Samurai: Waffen-SS in Action, Arco, 1983, 
 German Airborne Troops, 1939-45, 1983 
 Secret Police Forces of the World, 1986
 Hitler's Teutonic Knights: SS Panzers in action, Patrick Stephens Ltd, 1986
 Beginner's Guide to Wargaming, 1987
 The World's Elite Forces: The Men, Weapons and Operations in the War Against Terrorism, 1985
 Armoured Wargaming, Wildside, 1988
 Hitler: the victory that nearly was, David & Charles, London 1988, ISBN
 Encyclopaedia of the German Army in the 20th Century, Harper Collins, 1989
 Special Forces, 1990
 Weapons of the Waffen-SS: From Small Arms to Tanks, 1990
 Lightning Death: the story of the Waffen-SS, Patrick Stephens Ltd, 1991, 
 Waffen-SS Soldier, 1940-45, 1999
 The Ardennes Offensive: Central Sector: V Panzer Armee, 2000 
 The Ardennes Offensive: Central Sector: VII US Corps and VIII US Corps, 2000
 Fallschirmjäger: German Paratrooper 1935-45, 2001

Notes

References
 

 

1947 births
2004 deaths
People from Wellingborough
20th-century English historians